The rivière du Barrage (in English: river of the Dam) is a tributary of the east bank of the Samson River, which flows on the east bank of the Chaudière River; the latter flows northward to empty onto the south shore of the St. Lawrence River.

Toponymy 
The toponym Rivière du Barrage was formalized on December 5, 1968, at the Commission de toponymie du Québec.

See also 

 List of rivers of Quebec

References 

Rivers of Estrie
Le Granit Regional County Municipality